Benson Historic District or variations may refer to:

Benson Historic Barrio, listed on the National Register of Historic Places (NRHP)
Benson Historic District (Benson, North Carolina), NRHP-listed
Benson Commercial Historic District, Omaha, Nebraska, NRHP-listed